Rae O'Donnell is a former Hong Kong international lawn and indoor bowler.

Bowls career
O'Donnell won a gold medal at the 1981 World Outdoor Bowls Championship in Toronto in the triples with Lena Sadick and Linda King and a silver medal in the team event (Taylor Trophy). In 1985 she won a silver medal in the triples at the 1985 World Outdoor Bowls Championship in Melbourne with Sandra Zakoske and Helen Wong. She won a third triples medal at the 1988 World Outdoor Bowls Championship in Auckland after securing a bronze medal with Zakoske and Naty Rozario.

She won three medals at the Asia Pacific Bowls Championships.

She was national singles champion in 1991, pairs champion in 1985, 1987 & 1991, triples champion 1990 & 1991 and fours champion 1980, 1990 & 1991.

References

Hong Kong female bowls players
Living people
Bowls World Champions
Date of birth missing (living people)
Year of birth missing (living people)